In the Ya̧nomamö cosmos, '''Hei kä misi''' (literally, "this layer") is earth and the third highest of four vertically parallel layers. The Ya̧nomamö believe that Hei kä misi was created when a part of Hedu kä misi (Heaven) got dislodged and fell.

References

External links
 Chagnon, Napoleon A., Yanomamö: The Last Days of Eden (excerpts)

Yanomami mythology